Theodor Wirz (21 August 1842 – 13 September 1901) was a Swiss politician and President of the Swiss Council of States (1884/1885).

His brother Adalbert Wirz presided the same council in 1906/1907.

External links 
 
 

1842 births
1901 deaths
People from Obwalden
Swiss Roman Catholics
Christian Democratic People's Party of Switzerland politicians
Members of the National Council (Switzerland)
Members of the Council of States (Switzerland)
Presidents of the Council of States (Switzerland)